Love Can Make It Easier is the sixth studio album by  R&B group The Friends of Distinction, released in 1973 on the RCA Victor label. Neither this album nor its singles charted.

Track listing

Personnel
Harry Elston, Floyd Butler, Diane Jackson, Dani McCormick - vocals

References

External links

1973 albums
The Friends of Distinction albums
Albums produced by Jerry Peters
RCA Records albums